Elections to Amber Valley Borough Council were held on 4 May 2006.  One third of the council was up for election and the Conservative Party held overall control of the council.  Overall turnout was 34%.

After the election, the composition of the council was:
Conservative 27
Labour 18

Election result

Ward results

External links
BBC report of 2006 Amber Valley election result

2006
2006 English local elections
2000s in Derbyshire